Kunicki (feminine: Kunicka; plural: Kuniccy) is a Polish surname. Notable people with the surname include:

 Mikołaj Kunicki (1914–2001), Polish soldier
 Stanisław Kunicki (1861–1886), Polish revolutionary
 Stefan Kunicki (died 1684), Polish-Ukrainian Cossack
 Walter Kunicki (born 1958), American politician

See also
 

Polish-language surnames